Larry ten Voorde  (born 2 October 1996, in Enschede) is a Dutch racing driver who won the Porsche Mobil 1 Supercup in 2020 and 2021.

Racing record

Career summary

* Season still in progress.

Complete Porsche Supercup results
(key) (Races in bold indicate pole position) (Races in italics indicate fastest lap)

 No points were awarded at the Hockenheimring round as less than 50% of the scheduled race distance was completed.
* Season still in progress.

Complete 24 Hours of Le Mans results

References

External links 
 

1996 births
Living people
Dutch racing drivers
Porsche Supercup drivers
24 Hours of Le Mans drivers
24H Series drivers

Van Amersfoort Racing drivers
FIA World Endurance Championship drivers
Porsche Carrera Cup Germany drivers